Jefferson Mena Palacios (born June 15, 1989) is a Colombian footballer who currently plays as a centre back.

Club career

Independiente Medellín
Mena played for Independiente Medellín from 2011 to 2015.

New York City FC
On July 14, 2015, Mena signed for New York City FC. On July 26, Mena made his debut for the club coming on in the 15th minute for an injured Chris Wingert against Orlando City.

Mena scored his first goal for New York City on 23 September 2016, in a 4–1 win over Chicago Fire.

Barcelona S.C.
On 5 January 2017, it was announced that Mena would join Ecuadorian Serie A team Barcelona S.C. on a one-year loan, with the option to buy.

Aldosivi

In July 2018, after being released by New York City FC, Mena signed for Superliga Argentina team Aldosivi.

Career statistics

Club

References

External links

Player Profile at FotMob
New York City FC Profile

1989 births
Living people
Colombian footballers
Colombian expatriate footballers
Expatriate soccer players in the United States
Expatriate footballers in Argentina
Expatriate footballers in Ecuador
Colombian expatriate sportspeople in the United States
Colombian expatriate sportspeople in Argentina
Colombian expatriate sportspeople in Ecuador
Major League Soccer players
Argentine Primera División players
Categoría Primera A players
Ecuadorian Serie A players
Independiente Medellín footballers
New York City FC players
Aldosivi footballers
Águilas Doradas Rionegro players
Barcelona S.C. footballers
People from Apartadó
Association football defenders
Sportspeople from Antioquia Department
21st-century Colombian people